Wuhan Five Rings Sports Center, formerly known as Dongxihu Sports Center, is a sports complex located in Dongxihu District, Wuhan, Hubei, China. The complex consists of a 30,000-seat multipurpose stadium, an 8,000-seat gymnasium and a 3,000-seat natatorium. It broke ground on April 1, 2017, and expected to open in March 2019. On December 26, 2018, Shenzhen Kaisa Culture & Sports Group won the operative right of the Sports Center for nine years.

References

Sports venues in Wuhan
Football venues in China
Athletics (track and field) venues in China
Multi-purpose stadiums in China
Sports venues completed in 2019